Super Junior-T, an initialism for Super Junior-Trot is the second official sub-group of South Korean boy band Super Junior. They are the first idol group known for capitalizing trot music, the oldest form of Korean pop music. Formed in 2007, the group consists of five Super Junior members: Leeteuk, Heechul, Shindong, Sungmin, and Eunhyuk.

Super Junior-T released their debut CD single on 23 February 2007 the short span of their career before they were announced to be on hiatus in 2008. The single "Rokuko" was Korea's sixteenth best-selling record and the number one best-selling single of 2007, according to the Music Industry Association of Korea. In November 2008, the subgroup made their debut in Japan with released the Japanese version of "Rokuko".

History

Pre-debut
Noticing the dying trend of trot music, Lee Soo Man decided to revive the style by producing an idol band that capitalizes this genre. Three months before Super Junior-T's official debut, they performed "Don't Go Away" at the M.NET/KM Music Festival on November 25, 2006 with Super Junior's Donghae.

2007: Commercial success
In early February, SM Entertainment made the official announcement of a second Super Junior subgroup, Super Junior-T. The group released their debut single "Rokuko" on February 23, 2007 and on February 25, 2007, they officially debuted on SBS' Popular Songs, performing "Rokuko" and "First Express" with famous trot singer Bang Shilyi. The debut was also marked as Heechul's comeback performance after his injury from a car accident that occurred in August 2006.

"Rokuko" topped music charts three days after release. Two months later, the single topped Thailand-based music stations and remained in the same position for several weeks. By the end of 2007, the single sold almost 46,000 copies and was Korea's best-selling single of the year.

Two months later, Leeteuk, Shindong, and Eunhyuk were injured in a car accident, and all of Super Junior-T's schedules were completely canceled for two months. However, pre-recorded performances, such as the group's parody Palace T, continued to air on television and their single continued to top music charts. Schedules resumed in June, but only lasted a month.

2008: Performance tours and Japan
On April 29, 2008, it was announced that Super Junior-T would make a comeback later in the year with their second single. However, a fourth Super Junior sub-unit, Super Junior-Happy, debuted instead, putting Super Junior-T in partial hiatus. Nonetheless, Super Junior-T remained partially active throughout the year as they still appear as a group in Super Junior's concert tour, Super Show and other similar functions. Despite the debut of Super Junior-Happy, a future full-length album is still in the works and is expected to arrive in the future. Super Junior-T's latest appearance before the debut of Super Junior-Happy was on May 17, 2008, performing as the opening act at the 6th Korean Music Festival in Los Angeles, California.

On November 5, 2008, Super Junior-T re-released "Rokuko", now titled "ROCK&GO", in Japan. Presenting this project to the Japanese comedy duo Moeyan, who are skilled in combining comedy with song and dance, Super Junior-T hopes that the duo will help them localize the single into Japanese. The collaboration was the duo's official debut as singers and Super Junior-T's entrance in the Japanese market. The single debuted at #19 on the Oricon Daily Charts and jumped to #2 three days later. Super Junior-T and Moeyan held two mini concerts on the same release date as the single in the C.C. Lemon Hall at 
Tokyo to promote the record.

2015: "Love at First Sight"
In 2015, Super Junior returned with special album Devil on July 16 to celebrate the group's 10th anniversary. The album has a total of 10 tracks including the Track "Love at First Sight". The track is partly classified by Super Junior-T and Kang Junwoo writing lyrics and composing for it.

The group made their comeback performance on the Korean music show M! Countdown with the song "Love at First Sight" on July 16, 2015.

Image
Super Junior-T is well known for their parodies, such as the short miniseries Palace T, a parody of the popular Korean drama Princess Hours, which aired on the channel M.NET, as a part of Idol World.

Due to Super Junior-T's active participance in trot music and their comedic appearances, the group gained outstanding attention from the older audience despite their well-known young idol images that was created for them in the main group Super Junior. Members of Super Junior-T explained that they wanted to change their idol appearance and hope that they would gain different fans from their new trot image.

Discography

Videography

References

External links

 Super Junior-T Official Website

K-pop music groups
Musical groups established in 2007
2007 establishments in South Korea
South Korean boy bands
Super Junior subgroups
Trot groups
SM Entertainment artists
SM Town
South Korean dance music groups
Japanese-language singers of South Korea
Musical groups from Seoul